Agia Marina is a village in the municipality of Kea in the regional unit of Kea-Kythnos.

References

Populated places in Kea-Kythnos